Mastropiero que nunca was a theatrical humour/music show by Les Luthiers.
It was first performed on Friday 9 September 1977 and last done on Sunday 27 February 1983 (although it was headlining only during 1977 and 1978). It consisted of nine new (never performed previously) live numbers, which ranged from a madrigal to a salsa skit.

It was the first show where Les Luthiers experimented with the use of light as a dramatic element, collaborating with stage lighting professional Tito Diz.
The album recorded live in the Teatro Coliseo, Buenos Aires.

Numbers

Jingle Bass-Pipe: A taped introduction for the show, employing Marcos Mundstock's voice (as broadcaster) using puns.
La bella y graciosa moza (The beautiful gracious lass): A madrigal with humour relying again on puns. Sung (and probably written) by Marcos Mundstock.
El asesino misterioso (The mysterious killer): A long film advert, featuring Carlos Lopez Puccio playing the shoephone (a new instrument invented for the show).
Visita a la Universidad de Wildstone (Visit to Wildstone College): A short documentary, featuring Ernesto Acher playing another new instrument, the Calephone.
Kathy, la reina del saloon (Kathy, Queen of the Saloon): A Chaplin-esque number with Carlos Núñez playing piano, and the other five Luthiers making a comedic skit.
El beso de Ariadna (Ariadna's kiss): Three different versions of a love song, all of them sung by Daniel Rabinovich.
Sonatas para latín y piano (Sonatas for Latin and Piano): Four versions of an instrumental sonata, played by Carlos Nuñez (piano) and Carlos Lopez Puccio (violin).
Lazy Daisy: A music-hall number written and sung in English.
Payada de la vaca (Cow's Payada): A folkloric duel between two Argentinian payadores (played by Jorge Maronna and Daniel Rabinovich).
Cantata del Adelantado Don Rodrigo Díaz de Carreras: A long cantata including several folkloric passages, about a fictional Spaniard adelantado who'd pre-discovered South America.

At the end of each show, Les Luthiers came back for an encore, performing an older piece of theirs, which usually was one of the following:

Teorema de Tales (Thales' theorem as a song)
Oi Gadóñaya
El explicado (explanatory gato and the one they included in the filmed version).
Canción para moverse (when performing the show after 1979).

Cast

Ernesto Acher: Tambourine, Gom-Horn, Drums, Vocals, Calephone, Clarinet, Horn, Conga Percussion, Piano (*)

Carlos Lopez Puccio: Violin, Shoephone, Vocals, Kazoo, Bass, Latin Percussion.

Carlos Nuñez: Vocals, Recorder, Piano, Bunsen Flute.

Daniel Rabinovich: Violin, Vocals, Kazoo, Percussion, Bass-Pipe, Guitar.

Marcos Mundstock: Vocals, Percussion.

Jorge Maronna: Cello, Vocals, Bass, Cymbals, Kazoo, Guitar, Charango, Cuatro.

 Depending on which number they played as encore.

References

External links
Official Site (Spanish)
Todo sobre Les Luthiers (Spanish)

1979 live albums
Les Luthiers
Live albums recorded in Buenos Aires